Yeduguri Sandinti Rajasekhara Reddy (8 July 1949 – 2 September 2009), popularly known as YSR, was the 14th chief minister of the Indian state of Andhra Pradesh, serving from 2004 to 2009.

Reddy was elected to the 9th, 10th, 11th, and 12th Lok Sabha from the Kadapa constituency for four terms and to the Andhra Pradesh Assembly for five terms from the Pulivendula constituency. He won every election he contested. In 2003 he undertook a three-month-long padayatra, or walking tour, of  during the very hot summer months, across several districts in Andhra Pradesh as a part of his election campaign. He led his party to victory in the following general and assembly elections held in 2004, and did the same in 2009.

On 2 September 2009, a helicopter carrying Reddy went missing in the Nallamala Forest area. The next morning media reported that the helicopter wreckage had been found on top of Rudrakonda Hill,  from Kurnool. The five people aboard were pronounced dead at the scene of the crash. Over a hundred people were reported to have committed suicide on hearing the news of his death.

Personal life
Yeduguri Sandinti Rajasekhara Reddy was born on 8 July 1949 into a Christian Reddy middle class family as eldest of five sons  at Pulivendula. Rajasekhara Reddy completed his medical studies in Mahadevappa Rampure Medical College, Gulbarga, Karnataka and served as medical officer at CSI-Campbell Mission Hospital, Jammalamadugu, Kadapa district, Andhra Pradesh after completing his studies. In 1973, he established a 70-bed charitable hospital before entering politics. His father Raja Reddy was killed in a bomb attack on 23 May 1998.

Reddy was married to Vijaya Lakshmi. They had one son, politician Y. S. Jagan Mohan, and one daughter, Y. S. Sharmila. Reddy's younger brother Y. S. Vivekananda is also a Congress politician.

Reddy's parents were devout Christians, as was Reddy, who was buried according to Christian rites. Reddy visited Bethlehem and other historically important Christian places in Israel twice. He also visited the Hindu temple of Tirupati regularly.

Family tree

Early political career
Reddy entered active politics in 1978 and won the Pulivendula constituency same year and became Minister of State for Rural Development (1980–82), and later shifted to Excise Minister (1982) and Education Minister (1982–83). He continued to retain the same constituency in 1983 and 1985, even when Nandamuri Taraka Rama Rao swept to power and the party fared badly in the latter, which saw Indira Gandhi making him State president of the party. He even continued the winning streak for Kadapa constituency for four terms in 9th, 10th, 11th, and 12th Lok Sabha. His return to state politics saw him winning 1999 Assembly elections from same Pulivendula constituency during which he served as  Leader of Opposition in Andhra Pradesh State Assembly (1999–2004), but his subsequent winning in 2004 Assembly elections saw him sworn in as 14th Chief Minister of Andhra Pradesh serving full-term. He won 2009 Assembly elections and continued his tenure as 15th Chief Minister of Andhra Pradesh, which was abruptly cut short by his death on 2 September 2009.

Chief Ministership

First term 

During his tenure as Chief Minister, the government of Andhra Pradesh undertook the following projects:
 On the first day of his tenure in 2004, he provided free electricity for farmers, a campaign project.
 A free public ambulance service was originally started by Satyam and then adopted by Andhra Pradesh.
 The Pavala Vaddi program provided loans at 3% interest to encourage small businesses and entrepreneurship by rural women.
 Indiramma illu was a program started to construct heavily subsidised housing for the rural poor.
 A rice scheme provided a kilogram of rice for two rupees to reduce hunger.  The minimum support price for rice was also raised.
 Full reimbursement of college tuition for the underprivileged and reservations for minorities were instituted.
 The main emphasis during Reddy's tenure was on social welfare, with a majority of his projects targeted at reducing rural poverty. Apart from these schemes, his government was a role model in implementing the central government's flagship program NREGA.
 His tenure also saw the significant weakening of the violent extremist left-wing Naxalite movement that was rampant in the state when he assumed office in 2004.

He commenced the Jala Yagnam project to irrigate  of land through the construction of major, medium and minor irrigation projects. It helped Andhra Pradesh make significant progress in sustainable agriculture by making wastelands cultivatable.

Second term 

Reddy's major campaign slogan for the 2009 election was "Development and Credibility". He sought a mandate based on past performance, making no new election promises but vowing to continue and extend ongoing schemes. The opposition parties formed a 'Grand Alliance' (mahakootami) made up of all the major opposition parties including, Telugu Desam Party (TDP),  Telangana Rashtra Samithi (TRS) and the communist parties. The TDP promised numerous inducements including free color televisions and a unique cash transfer scheme (CTS). There was also a new party, Praja Rajyam Party (PRP), floated by a popular film star Chiranjeevi.

The Congress Party under the leadership of Reddy won the contest and came to power for a second time, winning 156 seats in the assembly (148 would be a simple majority). Reddy's party also won 33 seats in parliament out of a total of 42 seats. This feat was seen as a significant victory for Reddy, since he was able to earn a second consecutive term against the odds of anti-incumbency. He became the Congress party's first incumbent chief minister since 1969 to win based on his performance.

Reddy was sworn in as the Chief Minister for the term of 2009–2014 on 20 May 2009. The ceremony was held in Hyderabad's Lal Bahadur Shastri Stadium and was attended by a crowd of about 20,000 people.

Criticism
Reddy was accused of amassing large amounts of money during his tenure as the Chief Minister. He is said to have used populist schemes like irrigation projects and housing schemes to his advantage and earn huge profits through them. In a leaked United States diplomatic cable, the American Consul General quotes that there was "widespread corruption that was beyond the pale even for India".

The opposition parties demanded his resignation for owning the land in violation of the law. N. Chandrababu Naidu also called for Reddy's resignation after a 2007 Khammam police shooting resulted in eight deaths. Despite criticism, he won general and assembly elections and sworn in as Chief Minister again in 2009.

A federal probe of the Central Bureau of Investigation (CBI) was also launched to investigate disproportionate assets acquired by his son, Y. S. Jaganmohan Reddy, in return for favours his father made to the industrialists. In May 2012, the CBI arrested Mopidevi Venkataramana, the then Infrastructure Minister in Reddy's cabinet, who was responsible for unduly assigning the land to a private organisation called VANPIC. This incident called the credibility of Reddy's entire cabinet into question.

Disappearance and death

Reddy's Bell 430 helicopter went missing on Wednesday, 2 September 2009 at 9:35 am. Begumpet and Shamshabad air traffic controllers lost contact with the aircraft at 10:02 am while it was passing through the dense Nallamala forest area. The Chief Secretary of Andhra Pradesh, P. Ramakanth Reddy, said that inclement weather had forced the helicopter off course. Although the sparsely populated forest area is considered to be a stronghold of the outlawed Naxal communist insurgents, the National Security Advisor of India ruled out the possibility of the Naxals bringing down the helicopter.

The Indian Prime Minister's Office confirmed the helicopter's crash on the morning of 3 September, Thursday, and the death of all aboard, namely Reddy, his Special Secretary P. Subrahmanyam, Chief Security Officer A. S. C. Wesley, Group Captain S. K. Bhatia and Captain M. S. Reddy. The Director General of Police said that the bodies were charred beyond recognition and had to be identified on the basis of clothing. The autopsy of all the bodies was carried out at Kurnool Medical College.

An investigation eventually concluded that the factors that caused that crash included a problem with the transmission oil pressure system that distracted the crew from the worsening weather for more than six minutes. It was also noted that the pilots of the helicopter never discussed the bad weather, diverting, or returning to base.

Reddy's body was buried on 4 September at Idupulapai in Kadapa district with full state honours in accordance with Christian rites by the Church of South India clergy.

Aftermath 
A Telugu television station, NTV, reported that as many as 122 people died of shock or committed suicide upon hearing the news of Reddy's death, many of whom were young supporters or those who benefited from his social welfare schemes.  This was not, however, independently confirmed.

Finance Minister Konijeti Rosaiah was sworn in as Chief Minister following Reddy's death.

Six months after his death, Reddy's son, Jagan, began a condolence tour (Odarpu Yatra) to meet the families of those who either allegedly committed suicide or died of shock after hearing the death of his father. The Congress party's central leadership directed Jagan to call off the Odarpu Yatra, but he refused. The tour was successful and established Jagan as a major political force in state politics. He resigned from the Congress party on 29 November 2010 and announced on 7 December 2010 from Pulivendula that he would be starting a new party within 45 days. On 16 February the YSR Congress Party came into existence with Jagan as its president.

Elections for the seats left vacant due to the resignations of Jagan and Y. S. Vijayamma (Reddy's wife) were held on 8 May 2011. Contesting on behalf of the newly formed YSR Congress Party, Jagan and Vijayamma both won easily.

Honours
 On 8 July 2010, the Government of Andhra Pradesh renamed the Kadapa district as YSR district in honour of Reddy, who was a native of that district.
 On 14 Sep 2009, the Andhra Cricket Association renamed ACA-VDCA cricket stadium as Dr. Y. S. Rajasekhara Reddy ACA-VDCA Cricket Stadium .
 In 2020, the Andhra Pradesh Government declared YSR jayanti to be celebrated as Farmer's Day on 8th of July every year.

See also
 Indian National Congress
 Yatra
 Y. S. Jaganmohan Reddy
 Y. S. Vijayamma

References

External links 

 
 Official website on YSR Congress Party
 Official website of Chief Minister

1949 births
2009 deaths
Chief Ministers of Andhra Pradesh
Indian National Congress politicians
India MPs 1989–1991
India MPs 1991–1996
India MPs 1996–1997
India MPs 1998–1999
Indian Anglicans
Victims of aviation accidents or incidents in India
Victims of helicopter accidents or incidents
People from Kadapa
Lok Sabha members from Andhra Pradesh
YSR Congress Party
Leaders of the Opposition in the Andhra Pradesh Legislative Assembly
Sri Venkateswara University alumni
Chief ministers from Indian National Congress
20th-century Indian medical doctors
Church of South India
Accidental deaths in India
Indian Christians